KHNK (95.9 FM,  (Outlaw Country) is a commercial radio station in Columbia Falls, Montana, broadcasting to the Kalispell-Flathead Valley, Montana, area. KHNK airs a country music format.

It is owned by Bee Broadcasting, Inc.  All Bee Broadcasting stations are based at 2431 Highway 2 East, Kalispell.

References

External links
KHNK official website

HNK
Country radio stations in the United States
Radio stations established in 1995